Jean-François Gosselin (born April 17, 1975 in Quebec City, Quebec) is a politician from Quebec, Canada. He was an Action démocratique du Québec Member of the National Assembly for the electoral district of Jean-Lesage from 2007 to 2008. He is currently the leader of the opposition on Quebec City Council.

He graduated from the Rensselaer Polytechnic Institute in Troy, New York in 1999 where he obtained a bachelor and a master's degree in business administration. He then worked for sales and business development as well as in development and partnership strategies for 4 years including with Eastman Kodak. He was the manager of the Quebec City soccer ligue and was also a professional hockey player for the Shreveport Mudbugs of the Western Professional Hockey League in 1999. In the community, he worked for the Quebec Fondation for cystic fibrosis and made promotion tours in the United States for promoting French in community organization and schools.

Gosselin was first elected in the 2007 election with 40% of the vote.  Liberal incumbent and cabinet member Michel Després finished second with 29% of the vote.  Gosselin took office on April 12, 2007. He was defeated in the 2008 election.

Gosselin was a candidate for the Quebec Liberal Party in the 2012 election.

Footnotes

External links
 

1975 births
21st-century Canadian politicians
Action démocratique du Québec MNAs
Ice hockey people from Quebec City
French Quebecers
Living people
Rensselaer Polytechnic Institute alumni
RPI Engineers men's ice hockey players
Quebec City councillors